Peter McColgan (born 20 February 1963) is a Northern Irish former steeplechaser.

McColgan holds the Northern Irish 3000 metres indoor record with a time of 7:54.48 as well as the two (5:31.09) and three kilometre (8:27.93) Steeplechase outdoor records.

McColgan was born in Strabane, County Tyrone.  He was educated at Omagh CBS. He only took up athletics at the age of 17 and was coached until 1986 by Malcolm McCausland.

McColgan represented Northern Ireland the same year at the Commonwealth Games in Edinburgh and was a finalist in the 3000 metre Steeplechase and 5000 metres.

He also ran for Great Britain in the Steeplechase at the 1991 World Championships in Athletics in Japan,

Among his other accomplishments are a bronze medal in the 3000 metres steeplechase at the NCAA Championships (1986) in the United States and a sub four-minute mile clocking.

He has five children with his ex-wife Liz, including athlete Eilish.

References

Living people
1963 births
People from Strabane
Sportspeople from County Tyrone
British male steeplechase runners
Male long-distance runners from Northern Ireland
Commonwealth Games competitors for Northern Ireland
Athletes (track and field) at the 1986 Commonwealth Games
World Athletics Championships athletes for Great Britain